Howmeh Rural District is a rural district (dehestan) in the Central District of Harsin County, Kermanshah Province, Iran. At the 2006 census, its population was 8,925, in 1,952 families. The rural district has 35 villages.

References 

Rural Districts of Kermanshah Province
Harsin County